Eastern Philosophy is the first official album by rapper Apathy. After years of deals in limbo, Apathy was finally able to release his debut album, on Babygrande Records. "The Winter" was released as a single.

Track listing

Credits

Additional personnel 
 Anton Pukshansky — bass (track 3, 4), guitar (track 10)
 DJ Mek — scratches (track 3)
 Vertygo — keyboards (track 4)
 DJ Evil Dee — scratches (track 13)

Production 
 Chum the Skrilla Guerilla — track 1, 2, 5, 6, 9, 10, 12, 14
 Celph Titled — track 3
 Quincey Tones — track 4, 8
 Apathy — track 7, 12
 DJ Cheapshot — track 8
 Exact Beats — track 11
 8th & Vertygo — track 13

Other credits 
 Executive Producer: Apathy
 Mastering: Michael Sarsfield
 Mixing: Chum The Skrilla Guerilla
 Photography: Open Mic
 Artwork: Open Mic

References

2006 albums
Babygrande Records albums
Apathy (rapper) albums
Demigodz Records albums